Miguel Ángel Benítez Pavón (born 19 May 1970), also known as Peque Benítez, is a Paraguayan retired footballer who played as a forward.

He is best known for his spell with Spain's Espanyol, where he played for seven years. Altogether he spent one full decade in that country, representing three other teams and appearing in more than 200 official games overall.

A Paraguayan international in the late 1990s, Benítez represented the nation at the 1998 World Cup.

Club career
Benítez was born in Santísima Trinidad (Asunción). After playing for modest clubs in his country he arrived in Spain at the age of 23, purchased by Atlético Madrid, but appeared very rarely for the Colchoneros, being often demoted to its reserves and also being loaned twice, notably to CP Mérida which he helped promote from the second division by scoring a team-best ten goals in only five months.

Released by Atlético in the 1995 summer, Benítez signed with fellow La Liga side RCD Espanyol, going on to experience his best years: alternating between the starting XI and the bench, he amassed 166 competitive appearances for the Catalans, helping them to the 2000 conquest of the Copa del Rey.

Already in his 30s and dealing with some injuries, Benítez left Espanyol in January 2002, returning to his country and signing with Asunción's Club Olimpia. In his first year with Olimpia he helped the team to win Copa Libertadores, and the following season he won Recopa Sudamericana. In the years until his retirement he appeared for several clubs, and also returned to Spain, playing with UD Almería in the second level.

Benítez started his coaching career in 2008, taking charge of lowly Club Silvio Pettirossi as it was experiencing its first season in the Primera División – short-lived, as the side dropped down two tiers in as many years.

International career
Courtesy of his solid Espanyol performances, Benítez gained all of his 30 caps for the Paraguay national team. He was selected for the 1998 FIFA World Cup, playing in all four matches as the country reached the round-of-16 and netting in the 3–1 group stage win over Nigeria.

Benítez was also selected for the 1999 Copa América, played on home soil, scoring three times: this included one in Paraguay's 1–1 quarter-final clash against Uruguay, where he also missed the decisive penalty shootout attempt.

International goals

Honours
Espanyol
Copa del Rey: 1999–2000

Olimpia
Copa Libertadores: 2002
Recopa Sudamericana: 2003

References

External links

1970 births
Living people
Paraguayan footballers
Association football forwards
Paraguayan Primera División players
Club Olimpia footballers
Sportivo Luqueño players
La Liga players
Segunda División players
Atlético Madrid footballers
CP Mérida footballers
RCD Espanyol footballers
UD Almería players
Peruvian Primera División players
Club Universitario de Deportes footballers
Paraguay international footballers
Copa Libertadores-winning players
1998 FIFA World Cup players
1999 Copa América players
Paraguayan expatriate footballers
Expatriate footballers in Spain
Expatriate footballers in Peru
Paraguayan expatriate sportspeople in Spain
Paraguayan football managers